Karen Beyer is an American actress. Beyer has appeared in both film and television, including One Missed Call, Going to California, In the Heat of the Night, and many more.

Filmography

External links
 

American film actresses
American television actresses
Living people
Year of birth missing (living people)
20th-century American actresses
21st-century American actresses